

See also 
 United States House of Representatives elections, 1796 and 1797
 List of United States representatives from Kentucky

References 

1797
Kentucky
United States House of Representatives